Paizabad may refer to:
 Paizabad, Kermanshah
 Paizabad, West Azerbaijan